John Willis Williams was a state legislator in Arkansas. He served in the Arkansas House of Representatives in 1873 and then in the Arkansas Senate the following two years. He represented Phillips County.

See also
African-American officeholders during and following the Reconstruction era

References

People in 19th-century Arkansas
Members of the Arkansas House of Representatives
Arkansas state senators